Mount Uwaynat or Gabal El Uweinat (Arabic for 'Mountain of the springs')  is a mountain range in the area of the Egyptian-Libyan-Sudanese tripoint. Because of thousands of prehistoric rock art sites, it is considered an important witness to the development of early pastoralism in the Sahara.

Cultural significance 
The area is notable for its prehistoric rock carvings, first reported by the Egyptian explorer Ahmed Pasha Hassanein—the discoverer of Uweinat, who in 1923 traversed the first 40 km of the mountain towards east, without reaching the end. Engraved in sandstone, thousands of petroglyphs are visible, representing lions, giraffes, ostriches, gazelles, cows and little human figures. According to a technical report of UNESCO, "Thousands of rock art sites of different styles and themes are distributed all over the area, witnessing to the development of early pastoralism in Africa and exchanges among different ethnic groups across the Sahara."

Geography
Mount Uwaynat lies about 40 km S-SE of Jabal Arkanu. The main spring called Ain Dua lies at the foot of the mountain, on the Libyan side.  The western foot (located at  according to Hassanein) is 618 m high, and overcast with giant boulders fallen because of erosion. In general, the western slope constitutes an oasis, with wells, bushes and grass.

The western part of the massif consists of intrusive granite, arranged in a ring shape of some 25 km diameter, ending in three valleys (wadis) towards the West, named Karkur Hamid, Karkur Idriss and Karkur Ibrahim. Its eastern part consists of sandstone, ending in Karkur Talh. In Karkur Murr, there is a permanent oasis (Guelta), called Ain El Brins (Bir Murr). 

In the sandstone part, four plateaus emerge from the level of the surrounding desert: the Hassanein plateau, connected to an unnamed plateau through a narrow neck, the Italia plateau and another unnamed plateau. The highest point of Uweinat is on top of the Italia plateau. There are two cairns on the top, the first was erected by R.A. Bagnold and the second by Captain Marchesi, both in the 1930s.

Exploration 
Ahmed Pasha Hassanein—The discoverer who first published its existence on his 1923 map.
Prince Kamal al-Dine Hussein (son of Hussein Kamel, Sultan of Egypt)
Ralph Alger Bagnold—Founder of the Long Range Desert Group (LRDG) and desert explorer
Pat Clayton—LRDG and Egyptian Government Survey
László Almásy—Hungarian desert researcher
Hubert W. G. J. Penderel
Leo Frobenius
Hans Rhotert
Prinz Ferdinand von Lichtenstein
Mahmoud Marai (who co-discovered the Yam Inscriptions near the southern end of the mountain in 2007)

Sources

References

External links
Story of the discovery of Oeunat as written by the discoverer in National Geographic Magazine 1924
UNESCO World Heritage, Jebel Ouenat Technical Report, 2004
http://www.fjexpeditions.com/frameset/uweinat.htm
http://www.gilf-kebir.de/set2/2_01.htm
http://www.archaeoafrica.de/G_Auenat.html 
The 'Yam Inscriptions' of Pharaoh Montuhotep II
The Libyan desert - website with general information

Uweinat
Uweinat
Uweinat
Sahara
Saharan rock art
New Valley Governorate
Northern (state)
Cyrenaica